Robert Cowton was a Franciscan theologian active at the University of Oxford early in the fourteenth century. He was a follower of Henry of Ghent, and in the Augustinian tradition. He was familiar with the doctrines of Duns Scotus and Thomas Aquinas, and attempted a synthesis of them.

He entered the Franciscan Order before age 13. He presented a commentary on the Sentences of Peter Lombard around 1310. Later, in an abbreviated form, this became a standard textbook of theology. The work was criticised by Thomas Sutton.

Notes

References
B. Hechich (1958), De Immaculata Conceptione Beatae Mariae Virginis secundum Thomas de Sutton O.P. et Robertus Cowton O.F.M.
Hermann Theissing (1970), Glaube und Theologie bei Robert Cowton OFM

External links

Franaut page

English Franciscans
Scholastic philosophers
English theologians
14th-century English people
English philosophers
14th-century philosophers